Major General James Keith Dick-Cunyngham, CB, CMG, DSO (28 March 1877  – 6 November 1935) was a British Army officer who commanded 4th Division.

Military career
Educated at Cheltenham College, Dick-Cunyngham was commissioned into the Gordon Highlanders in 1898. He served in the Second Boer War and was appointed a Companion of the Distinguished Service Order (DSO), which he received from King Edward VII in an investiture at St. James′s Palace on 2 June 1902. He later served in the First World War briefly commanding 152nd (Seaforth and Cameron) Infantry Brigade before being taken prisoner-of-war at Le Cornet Malo in Northern France in April 1918. After the War he became an Assistant Adjutant General at the War Office, then commanded the British troops in France and Flanders until November 1921. He was appointed Commander of 152nd (Seaforth and Cameron) Infantry Brigade again in 1927 and then took a tour as Brigadier on the General Staff at Southern Command in India before becoming General Officer Commanding 53rd (Welsh) Division in 1932. His last appointment was as General Officer Commanding 4th Division in June 1935 before he died in November 1935.

Family
In 1905 he married Alice Daisy Deane; they had two daughters.

References

External links

|-

1877 births
1935 deaths
Military personnel from Gloucestershire
British Army major generals
Gordon Highlanders officers
Companions of the Order of the Bath
Companions of the Order of St Michael and St George
Companions of the Distinguished Service Order
People educated at Cheltenham College
People from Cheltenham
British Army generals of World War I
British World War I prisoners of war
World War I prisoners of war held by Germany